In the mathematical field of general topology, a meagre set (also called a meager set or a set of first category) is a subset of a topological space that is small or negligible in a precise sense detailed below.  A set that is not meagre is called nonmeagre, or of the second category.  See below for definitions of other related terms.

The meagre subsets of a fixed space form a σ-ideal of subsets; that is, any subset of a meagre set is meagre, and the union of countably many meagre sets is meagre.

Meagre sets play an important role in the formulation of the notion of Baire space and of the Baire category theorem, which is used in the proof of several fundamental results of functional analysis.

Definitions

Throughout,  will be a topological space.

The qualifier "in " can be omitted if the ambient space is fixed and understood from context.

A topological space is called  (respectively) if it is a meagre (respectively, nonmeagre) subset of itself. 

(This use of the prefix "co" is consistent with its use in other terms such as "cofinite".)
A subset is comeagre in  if and only if it is equal to a countable intersection of sets, each of whose interior is dense in  

The notions of nonmeagre and comeagre should not be confused.  If the space  is meagre, every subset is both meagre and comeagre, and there are no nonmeagre sets.  If the space  is nonmeager, no set is at the same time meagre and comeager, every comeagre set is nonmeagre, and there can be nonmeagre sets that are not comeagre, that is, with nonmeagre complement.  See the Examples section below.

Importantly, this is not the same as being meagre in the whole space . (See the Properties and Examples sections below for the relationship between the two.) Similarly, a nonmeagre subspace will be a set that is nonmeagre in itself, which is not the same as being nonmeagre in the whole space. Be aware however that in the context of topological vector spaces some authors may use the phrase "meagre/nonmeagre subspace" to mean a vector subspace that is a meagre/nonmeagre set relative to the whole space.

The terms first category and second category were the original ones used by René Baire in his thesis of 1899.  The meagre terminology was introduced by Bourbaki in 1948.

Properties

Consequently, any closed subset with empty interior is meagre. Thus a closed nonmeagre subset of  must have nonempty interior.

(1) Any subset of a meagre set is meagre; (2) any countable union of meagre sets is meagre.  Thus the meagre subsets of a fixed space form a σ-ideal of subsets, a suitable notion of negligible set.  And, equivalently to (1), any superset of a nonmeagre set is nonmeagre.

Dually, (1) any superset of a comeagre set is comeagre; (2) any countable intersection of comeagre sets is comeagre.

Suppose  where  has the subspace topology induced from   The set  may be meagre in  without being meagre in   However the following results hold:
 If  is meagre in  then  is meagre in 
 If  is open in  then  is meagre in  if and only if  is meagre in 
 If  is dense in  then  is meagre in  if and only if  is meagre in 
And correspondingly for nonmeagre sets:
 If  is nonmeagre in  then  is nonmeagre in 
 If  is open in  then  is nonmeagre in  if and only if  is nonmeagre in 
 If  is dense in  then  is nonmeagre in  if and only if  is nonmeagre in 

Any topological space that contains an isolated point is nonmeagre (because no set containing the isolated point can be nowhere dense).  In particular, every nonempty discrete space is nonmeagre.

Every nonempty Baire space is nonmeagre.  In particular, by the Baire category theorem every nonempty complete metric space and every nonempty locally compact Hausdorff space is nonmeagre.

 In any topological space  the union of an arbitrary family of meagre open sets is a meagre set.

Meagre subsets and Lebesgue measure

A meagre set in  need not have Lebesgue measure zero, and can even have full measure.

Dually, there can be nonmeagre sets with measure zero.

where  is a sequence that enumerates the rational numbers.

Relation to Borel hierarchy

Just as a nowhere dense subset need not be closed, but is always contained in a closed nowhere dense subset (viz, its closure), a meagre set need not be an  set (countable union of closed sets), but is always contained in an  set made from nowhere dense sets (by taking the closure of each set).

Dually, just as the complement of a nowhere dense set need not be open, but has a dense interior (contains a dense open set), a comeagre set need not be a  set (countable intersection of open sets), but contains a dense  set formed from dense open sets.

Examples

The empty set is a meagre subset of every topological space.

In the nonmeagre space  the set  is meagre.  The set  is nonmeagre and comeagre.

In the nonmeagre space  the set  is nonmeagre.  But it is not comeagre, as its complement  is also nonmeagre.

A countable T1 space without isolated point is meagre. So it is also meagre in any space that contains it as a subspace.

It is nonmeagre in itself (since as a subspace it contains an isolated point).

The line  is meagre in the plane   But it is a nonmeagre subspace, that is, it is nonmeagre in itself.

The space  (with the topology induced from ) is meagre.  Its meagre subset  is nonmeagre in itself.

There is a subset  of the real numbers  that splits every nonempty open set into two nonmeagre sets.

Since  is a complete metric space, it is nonmeagre. In particular that set is not empty. This is one way to show the existence of continuous nowhere differentiable functions.

Banach–Mazur game

Meagre sets have a useful alternative characterization in terms of the Banach–Mazur game. 
Then there is a Banach–Mazur game  

Erdos-Sierpinski duality
Many arguments about meagre sets also apply to null sets, i.e. sets of Lebesgue measure 0. The Erdos-Sierpinski duality theorem states that if the continuum hypothesis holds, there is an involution from reals to reals where the image of a null set of reals is a meagre set, and vice versa. In fact, the image of a set of reals under the map is null if and only if the original set was meagre, and vice versa.

See also

 
 , for analogs to residual
 , for analogs to meagre

Notes

Bibliography

  
  
 
  
  

General topology
Descriptive set theory